Gurvan-e Kuchak (also Romanized as Gūrvān-e Kūchak; also known as Gūrān and Gūzvān-e Kūchak) is a village in Qeshlaq Rural District, in the Central District of Ahar County, East Azerbaijan Province, Iran. At the 2006 census, its population was 15, in 5 families.

References 

Populated places in Ahar County